Everlasting is the eleventh studio album by American singer Natalie Cole, released on June 14, 1987 by Manhattan Records. The album peak to number 8 on Billboards Top R&B Albums chart, and scored three hit singles – "Jump Start" and "I Live for Your Love" both hit top 5 on US R&B Songs, and "Pink Cadillac" a top five hit on the US Hot 100. 

The album was certified gold by the Recording Industry Association of America (RIAA), her first album to be certified since 1979's We're the Best of Friends with Peabo Bryson. Everlasting earned a nomination for Best Female R&B Vocal Performance at the 1988 Grammy Awards.

Production
The duo The Calloways contributed to the tracks "Jump Start", a cover of Bruce Springsteen's "Pink Cadillac", and "I Live for Your Love". Also included are the Bacharach and David songs "In My Reality" and "Split Decision". A cover of "When I Fall in Love", and "More Than the Stars" features José Feliciano on vocals and guitar.

Track listing 

Track 11 is not included on vinyl versions of the album other than on copy MTLX 1012, where it is present as track 6 of side B, although not listed on the sleeve, jacket or disc label.

Personnel 

 Natalie Cole – lead vocals, backing vocals (2, 5–8, 11)
 Aaron Zigman – all instruments (1)
 Jerry Knight – all instruments (1)
 Joel Davis – keyboards (2, 9)
 Odeen Mays Jr. – keyboards (2, 9)
 David Ervin – keyboard programming (2), synthesizer programming (2), drum programming (2), keyboards (9)
 Claude Gaudette – keyboards (3, 6, 7), arrangements (3, 7)
 Randy Kerber – keyboards (4, 8)
 Burt Bacharach – synthesizers (4, 8)
 Nat Adderley Jr. – keyboards (5), arrangements (5)
 Jeff Bova – synthesizer programming (5)
 Charles Floyd – acoustic piano (10), synthesizers (10)
 Greg Phillinganes – keyboards (11)
 Andy Goldmark – additional keyboards (11)
 Bruce Roberts – additional keyboards (11)
 Gene Robinson – guitars (2, 9)
 Dann Huff – guitars (3, 4, 8)
 Ira Siegel – guitars (5)
 Paul Jackson Jr. – guitars (6, 7, 11), arrangements (6), rhythm guitar (10)
 José Feliciano – acoustic guitar (10), hand and mouth percussion (10), lead vocals (10)
 Marcus Miller – bass (3, 5), guitars (5)
 Neil Stubenhaus – bass (4, 6-8, 11)
 Abraham Laboriel – bass (10)
 Carlos Vega – drums (4)
 Buddy Williams – drums (5)
 Mike Baird – drums (6, 7)
 John Robinson – drums (8, 10, 11)
 Lenny Castro – percussion (3)
 Paulinho da Costa – percussion (4, 11)
 Shandu Akiem – percussion (9)
 Steve Samuel – percussion (10)
 Larry Williams – saxophone solo (1), synthesizers (4, 8)
 Tom Scott – saxophone (3)
 David Boruff – saxophone solo (4, 8)
 Kenny G – alto sax solo (5)
 Jerry Hey – horns (8), trumpet (8), flugelhorn (8), horn arrangements (8)
 Reggie Calloway – arrangements (2, 9)
 Chase/Rucker Productions – flute and string arrangements (10)
 Eddie Cole – backing vocals (2), rhythm arrangements (9)
 Katrina Perkins – backing vocals (2)
 Stephanie Spruill – backing vocals (4)
 Julia Waters Tillman – backing vocals (4, 7)
 Maxine Waters Willard – backing vocals (4, 7)
 David Joyce – backing vocals (5), synthesizers (10)
 Siedah Garrett – backing vocals (7)
 Mendy Lee – backing vocals (7)
 Oren Waters – backing vocals (7)
 Phillip Ingram – backing vocals (8)
 Joe Pizzulo – backing vocals (8)
 The "N" Sisters – backing vocals (10)

Production

 Gerry Griffith – executive producer 
 Jerry Knight – producer (1)
 Aaron Zigman – producer (1)
 Reggie Calloway – producer (2, 9)
 Vincent Calloway – co-producer (2, 9)
 Dennis Lambert – producer (3, 6, 7)
 Burt Bacharach – producer (4, 8)
 Carole Bayer-Sager – producer (4, 8)
 Marcus Miller– producer (5)
 Paul Jackson Jr. – associate producer (6)
 Eddie Cole – producer (10), mixing (10)
 Natalie Cole – producer (10), mixing (10)
 Andy Goldmark – producer (11)
 Bruce Roberts – producer (11)
 Mick Guzauski – recording (1, 4, 8), mixing (1, 4, 8)
 Craig Burbidge – recording (2, 9)
 Paul Ericksen – recording (2, 9), assistant engineer (6)
 Glen Holguin – recording (2, 9)
 Robin Jenny – recording (2, 9)
 Jim Krause – recording (2, 9)
 Taavi Mote – recording (2, 9), mixing (2, 9)
 Gabe Veltri – recording (2, 9)
 Jeremy Smith – recording (3, 6, 7), mixing (3, 6, 7)
 Bruce Miller – engineer (5)
 Ed Thacker – engineer (5)
 Ray Bardani – mixing (5)
 Mark Wolfson – engineer (10), mixing (10)
 Tom Perry – additional recording (4, 8)
 Tommy Vicari – additional recording (4, 8)
 Gary Wagner – assistant engineer (1, 4), mixing (8)
 Sabrina Buchanek – assistant engineer (2, 9)
 John Hegedes – assistant engineer (2, 9)
 Jeff Lorenzen – assistant engineer (2, 9)
 Elmer Slores – assistant engineer (2, 9)
 Tony Spataro – assistant engineer (2, 9)
 Liz Cluse – assistant engineer (3, 7)
 Ron DaSilva – assistant engineer (3)
 Marnie Riley – assistant engineer (4), recording (8), mixing (8)
 Clark Germain – assistant engineer (5)
 Bruce Gisoni – assistant engineer (5)
 Paul Huggins – assistant engineer (5)
 Bill Miranda – assistant engineer (5)
 Neil Nappe – assistant engineer (5)
 Bino Espinoza – assistant engineer (6), recording (7)
 Kathy Botich – assistant engineer (10)
 Sean Stancioff – assistant engineer (10), mixing (10)
 Alan Gregory – engineer (11)
 Glen Hoalguin – engineer (11)
 Barney Perkins – engineer (11), mixing (11)
 Marrianne Pellicci – production assistant (3, 6, 7)
 Bibi Green – production coordinator (5)
 Debra Bishop – design 
 Koppel & Scher – design 
 The Cream Group – cover design, layout (UK release)
 Moshe Brakha – photography 
 Matthew Rolston – cover photography (UK release)
 Emory Jones – hair
 Wendy Cooper – make-up
 Cecille Parker – stylist 
 Dan Cleary – management

Studios
 Recorded at Conway Studios, Soundcastle and Ocean Way Recording (Hollywood, California); Larrabee Sound Studios and One On One Studios (North Hollywood, California); Lion Share Recording Studios, Studio 55 and Image Recording Studios (Los Angeles, California); Encore Studios and O'Henry Sound Studios (Burbank, California); Fifth Floor Recording Studios (Cincinnati, Ohio); House of Music (West Orange, New Jersey); Messina Music (New York City, New York).
 Mixed at Conway Studios and Soundcastle (Hollywood, California);  Larrabee Sound Studios and Entourage Studios (North Hollywood, California); Right Track Recording (New York City, New York).

Charts

Weekly charts

Year-end charts

Certifications and sales

References

1987 albums
Natalie Cole albums
Albums produced by Burt Bacharach
Albums produced by Marcus Miller